The Pingle Academy is a co-educational secondary school and sixth form located at Coronation Street in Swadlincote, South Derbyshire, England. The name comes from the former Pingle Farm; Pingle being a Midlands term for a small field or allotment.

Overview
The Pingle Academy educates over 1,500 students, from Years 7 to 13. GCSEs and A-Levels are taught here throughout the different years.

Sport
The school has a football team, rugby team and a basketball team for all years up to Year 11.  Also in 2006, the school had an Astroturf field added to their large range of facilities which was opened by athlete Kriss Akabusi.

These facilities include:
 A regular sized swimming pool; used in lessons and out of school curriculum activities
 Multimillion-pound sports hall with gym suite
 Gymnastics hall
 Tennis/Basketball courts
 Full size multi sport Artificial Turf pitch

2005 Pingle School fire
On 2 December 2005, the Pingle School sixth-form building caught fire as a result of a 'break time prank gone wrong'. This resulted in the near total destruction of the sixth-form building. The fire was started within school hours and required the evacuation of the entire school population. Three 15-year-old boys were arrested in connection with the fire, one of whom was charged with arson and sentenced to 18 months' detention. Since the sixth-form centre was destroyed in the fire, temporary accommodation for lessons saw the use of portable classrooms, provided by Portakabin Ltd from their centre in Derby. The new sixth-form area was officially opened in December 2007, being in full use from February 2008. There were two other major fires at The Pingle Academy prior to this incident.

References

External links
 
 Pictures of the December 2005 fire
 EduBase
 

Educational institutions established in 1965
Secondary schools in Derbyshire
School buildings in the United Kingdom destroyed by arson
Academies in Derbyshire
1965 establishments in England